This is a list of English rugby league stadiums. It contains all finals venues and professional club grounds in addition to select amateur club grounds, ranked in descending order of seating capacity.

Existing stadiums

Former stadiums

Existing stadiums no longer used for rugby league

Demolished stadiums

Future stadiums
Stadiums which are currently in development, and are likely to open in the near future, include:

There are usually also several expansions to existing grounds in progress.

See also
 List of rugby league stadiums by capacity
 List of Australian rugby league stadiums by capacity
 List of stadiums in the United Kingdom by capacity
 List of English rugby union stadiums by capacity

Notes

References

 The Internet Football Ground Guide

External links

Rugby league stadiums in England
Defunct rugby league venues in England
Stadiums, English, by capacity
Rugby league stadiums, capacity
England sport-related lists
Lists of sports venues with capacity